During the 1927–28 English football season, Brentford competed in the Football League Third Division South. A season of transition saw the Bees finish in mid-table and score 76 goals, which was at that time the club's best goalscoring tally since joining the Football League in 1920.

Season summary

Despite a sizeable amount of money in the bank after the previous season's cup exploits and big money sales of Jack Allen, Archie Clark and George Anderson, Brentford manager Harry Curtis elected to add to, rather than rebuild, his squad for the 1927–28 season. He invested in Scottish youngsters John Cairns, Jimmy Drinnan, William Hodge, Alexander Stevenson, Samuel Ward and English teenager Joe Wiggins.

Three defeats in the opening 10 matches of the season put the Bees as high as second place, with off-season signing Jack Phillips scoring 9 goals, Herbert Lawson five and Ernie Watkins four. By mid-October 1927, the goals had dried up and the club dropped to mid-table. During this period, Brentford suffered a club record 7–1 FA Cup defeat to Manchester United. A 3–2 victory over Walsall at Griffin Park on 5 December (one of just two wins in the midst of the bad run) was witnessed by 2,024, the club record lowest for a home Football League match. The Bees' form picked up again late January 1928 and the team secured a 12th-place finish. Jack Phillips finished the season as he began it, with 9 goals in 10 matches, to finish as top-scorer with 18 goals. Brentford's 76 goals was the highest since joining the Football League in 1920 and the club finished the season £171 in profit (equivalent to £ in ).

League table

Results
Brentford's goal tally listed first.

Legend

Football League Third Division South

FA Cup

 Sources: Statto, 11v11, 100 Years of Brentford

Playing squad 
Players' ages are as of the opening day of the 1927–28 season.

 Sources: Timeless Bees, Football League Players' Records 1888 to 1939, 100 Years Of Brentford

Coaching staff

Statistics

Appearances and goals

Players listed in italics left the club mid-season.
Source: 100 Years of Brentford

Goalscorers 

Players listed in italics left the club mid-season.
Source: 100 Years of Brentford

Management

Summary

Transfers & loans 
Cricketers are not included in this list.

References 

Brentford F.C. seasons
Brentford